Ziaur Rahman Ziaur (born 1 October 1981) is a Bangladeshi kabaddi player who was on the team that won the bronze medal at the 2006 Asian Games. He also played in PKL for  Puneri Paltan.

References

Living people
1981 births
Bangladeshi kabaddi players
Place of birth missing (living people)
Asian Games medalists in kabaddi
Kabaddi players at the 2002 Asian Games
Kabaddi players at the 2006 Asian Games
Kabaddi players at the 2014 Asian Games
Asian Games silver medalists for Bangladesh
Asian Games bronze medalists for Bangladesh
Medalists at the 2002 Asian Games
Medalists at the 2006 Asian Games